Harry Baines Lott (1781–1833), of Tracey House, Awliscombe, Devon, was an English politician.

He was a Member of Parliament (MP) for Honiton 1826–1830 and 1831–1832.

References

External links 
 

1781 births
1833 deaths
Members of the Parliament of the United Kingdom for Honiton
UK MPs 1826–1830
UK MPs 1831–1832